Montague Garrard Drake (1692–1728), of Shardeloes, near Amersham, Buckinghamshire was a British Tory politician who sat in the House of Commons between 1713 and 1728.

Life

Drake was the only surviving son of Montagu Drake MP of Shardeloes, near Amersham, Buckinghamshire and his wife Jane Garrard, daughter of Sir John Garrard, 3rd Baronet. His father died in 1698 and he succeeded to the estates. He was educated privately under Philip Ayres and matriculated at St John's College, Oxford on 16 July 1706 aged 15 and was awarded MA on 16 July 1709. From 1710 to 1712, he undertook the Grand Tour visiting  Netherlands, Italy, Switzerland and France between 1710 and 1712 studying at Padua in 1710.

Drake was returned unopposed as Member of Parliament for Amersham at the 1713 British general election as soon as he came of age. He was re-elected in 1715  and in 1722, but in 1722 decided to sit for Buckinghamshire instead. He voted against the Administration in all recorded divisions. However, at the 1727 British general election, it was said that the populace were  mutinous and so exasperated with the great Mr. Drake, [whom] they considered the chief promoter of the compromise and against the rights of the freeholders that he decided to return to Amersham where he was elected in 1727.

Drake's tomb in Amersham was designed and sculpted by Peter Scheemakers.

Family

Drake married Isabella Marshall daughter of Thomas Marshall merchant of St. Michael Bassishaw, London on 13 October 1719. He died at Bath on 26 April 1728. His son William was also MP for Amersham.

References

1692 births
1728 deaths
People from Amersham
Alumni of St John's College, Oxford
British MPs 1713–1715
British MPs 1715–1722
British MPs 1722–1727
British MPs 1727–1734
Members of the Parliament of Great Britain for English constituencies